Piłsudczyk may refer to:

Person 
 Piłsudskiite, a supporter of Poland's Marshal Józef Piłsudski during the early twentieth century

Vehicle 
 Piłsudczyk (armoured train), a Polish armed train of the early twentieth century